Vincent Maurice Coleman (born September 22, 1961) is an American former Major League Baseball (MLB) player, best known for his years with the St. Louis Cardinals. He was a switch hitter and threw right-handed.

He was a baserunning consultant
for the Chicago White Sox during the 2015 season. 
He was hired by the San Francisco Giants in 2017 as a minor-league baserunning and outfield coach.

Early years
Coleman attended William M. Raines High School in Jacksonville, Florida, and then Florida A&M University in Tallahassee. In 1981, he set the all-time single-season stolen base record at Florida A&M, with seven steals in a single game and 65 steals in a season. He led NCAA Division I that year in both total steals and stolen base percentage.

While at Florida A&M, Coleman was also a kicker and punter on the Florida A&M Rattlers football team, where he followed in the footsteps of his cousin, Greg Coleman, who was also a punter at Florida A&M in the 1970s and went on to a 12-year career in the National Football League. Vince Coleman was a member of the Rattlers team that won the 1978 NCAA Division I-AA Football Championship Game. He was named to the all-conference team in both 1980 and 1981 and kicked a game-winning 34-yard field goal in an unlikely 16–13 Rattlers win over the Division I-A Miami Hurricanes in 1979.

Coleman signed as a free agent with the Washington Redskins in 1982 but quit after a week of training camp because the team wanted to convert him into a wide receiver.

Coleman chose to pursue a baseball career when he was drafted in the 10th round of the 1982 Major League Baseball draft by the St. Louis Cardinals. He stole 145 bases in a single season with the Macon Redbirds of the South Atlantic League in 1983; Coleman did so despite missing a month of the season with a broken hand. He further demonstrated his speed and base-stealing ability with 101 steals for the Louisville Redbirds of the American Association in 1984, before being called up to the majors.

Major League Baseball career

St. Louis Cardinals
Coleman stole 110 bases in his rookie season. As of 2022, the 110 steals are the ninth-highest in Major League history. Coleman stole over 100 bases in each of the following two seasons as well, making him the only player in the 20th century to post three consecutive seasons of 100 or more steals and the first player in Major League history to steal 100 bases in the first three seasons of their career. By the end of only his second year, his 217 stolen bases were second in Cardinal history behind Lou Brock's 888, just ahead of the 203 by Jack Smith. Before signing as a free agent with New York, Coleman led the National League in stolen bases in every season he played with the Cardinals (–), becoming one of just four players ever to lead his league in six consecutive seasons. The other players to accomplish this feat are Rickey Henderson, Luis Aparicio, and Maury Wills. Coleman, Henderson, Wills, and Brock are the only players to steal 100 bases in a season. Only Coleman and Henderson have three different 100-steal seasons to their credit, and only Coleman reached the total in three consecutive years.

As the leadoff hitter for St. Louis, Coleman helped the team reach the 1985 playoffs. However, he suffered an injury prior to the fourth game of the National League Championship Series, when the automatic tarpaulin at Busch Stadium rolled over his leg during routine stretching exercises. The injury sidelined him for the rest of the postseason, and the Cardinals eventually lost a seven-game World Series to Kansas City. Following the season, Coleman became the fourth-ever unanimous selection for the NL Rookie of the Year Award.

In 1985, Coleman declared, "I don't know nothin' about him. Why are you asking me about Jackie Robinson?" Responding to Coleman, Rachel Robinson, Jackie Robinson's widow said, "I hope somehow he'll learn and be embarrassed by his own ignorance."

He stole second and third base in the same inning 13 times that year. Coleman played in the World Series that year, the only one he would appear in. He batted .143 while reaching base six times (four hits, two walks) and stealing six bases without being caught. In the field, he made two assists (i.e. throws to home from left field for outs), both coming in Game 7; he was the first outfielder to throw two runners out at the plate in one World Series game. The Cardinals lost the Series in 7 games to the Minnesota Twins.

In 1989, Coleman compiled a streak of 50 successful stolen bases without being caught stealing, before it was broken on July 28 when he was thrown out by Montreal Expos catcher Nelson Santovenia in a game at Olympic Stadium.

In June 1990, he recorded his 500th stolen base in just his 804th game, the fewest that any player has needed to reach that milestone. As of the end of the 2021 MLB season, he is the last player to steal 100 bases in a single season.

New York Mets
Coleman left for the Mets after the 1990 season via free agency, signing a four-year, $11.95 million contract. However, his career took a quick downward spiral. He missed 215 games (out of a possible 486) due to numerous injuries and suspensions. Coleman was one of three Met players named in a sexual assault complaint filed by a 31-year-old woman in Florida, although prosecutors did not pursue charges in the case. His base-stealing strategy became increasingly suspect; he often ignored or misinterpreted his coaches' signs on the basepaths. He was also very difficult to get along with. He got into an argument with coach Mike Cubbage at the end of his first season with the Mets, which was a factor in manager Bud Harrelson's ouster. In September 1992, he got into a fight with Harrelson's successor, Jeff Torborg, and was suspended without pay for the rest of the season. The Mets seemingly had enough and tried to trade him, but there were no takers. In April 1993, Coleman injured Dwight Gooden's arm by recklessly swinging a golf club in the clubhouse. Three months later, Coleman was charged with endangerment when he threw a lit firecracker into a crowd of baseball fans waiting for autographs in the Dodger Stadium parking lot. The explosion injured three children, including a two-year-old, Amanda Santos. He was sentenced to 200 hours of community service for the incident while the Mets suspended him with pay. On August 26, the Mets announced that as part of a general house-cleaning of the clubhouse, Coleman would not return in 1994. Manager Dallas Green said that while Coleman had played well, he did not think he had the "head and heart and belly" he wanted to see on the team.

Later career
At the end of the season, the Mets traded him, with cash, to the Kansas City Royals for Kevin McReynolds. He recorded 76 steals in 179 games as a Royal before being traded to the Seattle Mariners in mid-.  found Coleman with the Cincinnati Reds, and was subsequently released by the team in June, and he signed with the California Angels, but never played a game for the team. Coleman's final season in the major leagues came in 1997 with the Detroit Tigers, where he again received limited playing time and little success on the basepaths or elsewhere.

Coleman attempted a comeback with the St. Louis Cardinals in 1998 and hit over .300 in spring training, but did not earn a spot on the opening-day roster. He was assigned to the AAA Memphis Redbirds, where he continued to play well, stealing eight bases and hitting .316 with an on-base percentage of .395 in 20 games as the club's regular left fielder and leadoff man. However, after failing to receive a promotion to St. Louis, Coleman elected to retire in May 1998.

Through the 2021 MLB season, Coleman ranks sixth in all-time career stolen bases in the major leagues, with 752. , Coleman ranks 52nd all-time in career stolen base percentage among all players with 80 or more attempts, at 80.9%.

Coaching
The Chicago White Sox added Vince Coleman to their staff as a base-running instructor in 2015. He stayed with the Sox for only one season. The San Francisco Giants hired him as a roving Minor League baserunning and outfield coach in 2017.

Personal life 
Coleman is African-American and Catholic.

Accomplishments
Sixth all-time for career stolen bases (752)
National League Rookie of the Year (1985)
Most stolen bases in a season by a rookie, with 110 in 1985
Holds three of the top six stolen base seasons: #3 (110 in 1985), #4 (109 in 1987) and #6 (107 in 1986.) The three seasons were consecutive.
The only man ever to steal 100-or-more bases in 3 consecutive seasons: 110 in 1985, 107 in 1986, and 109 in 1987.
The last man to steal 100 bases in a season, in 1987.
Two-time All-Star (1988–89)
Led the Major Leagues in stolen bases four times (1985–87, 1990)
Led the National League in stolen bases six consecutive years (1985–90)
Holds an MLB record with 50 consecutive stolen bases without being caught stealing (September 18, 1988 – July 26, 1989)

See also
 List of Major League Baseball stolen base records
 List of Major League Baseball individual streaks
 List of Major League Baseball career stolen bases leaders
 List of Major League Baseball annual stolen base leaders
 Major League Baseball titles leaders
 List of St. Louis Cardinals team records

References

External links

Vince Coleman at Baseball Almanac

1961 births
Living people
African-American baseball players
African-American players of American football
African-American Catholics
American expatriate baseball players in Canada
Baseball players from Jacksonville, Florida
Cincinnati Reds players
Detroit Tigers players
Florida A&M Rattlers baseball players
Florida A&M Rattlers football players
Indianapolis Indians players
Johnson City Cardinals players
Kansas City Royals players
Louisville Redbirds players
Macon Redbirds players
Major League Baseball left fielders
Major League Baseball Rookie of the Year Award winners
Memphis Redbirds players
National League All-Stars
National League stolen base champions
New York Mets players
Omaha Royals players
Players of American football from Jacksonville, Florida
Seattle Mariners players
St. Louis Cardinals players
St. Lucie Mets players
Vancouver Canadians players
21st-century African-American people
20th-century African-American sportspeople